Abdennour Abrous (born September 15, 1934 in Oujda, Morocco, died April 16, 2020 in New York City), was a former Algerian politician. He was a United Nations civil servant who helped organize the global response against apartheid in South Africa in the 1970s and 1980s in his role as assistant director and officer-in-charge of the UN Center Against Apartheid. He also was manager of the UN's Educational and Training Programme for Southern Africa. Abrous retired from the UN in 2003 and resided in New York.

Before joining the UN, Abrous was head of publicity in Addis Ababa for the Organization of African Unity (OAU). He represented the provisional government of independent Algeria in Indonesia during Algeria's struggle for independence, and fought with the National Liberation Front during Algeria's 1954–1962 revolution.  His first cousin is Hocine Aït Ahmed, one of the "chefs historiques" of the Algerian war for independence and later a prominent opposition party leader.

While studying for a master's degree at the University of Pennsylvania he played for the 1960-61 championship winning Ukrainian Nationals soccer club.

References

1934 births
2020 deaths
Algerian diplomats
Kabyle people
Algerian officials of the United Nations
Ambassadors of Algeria to Indonesia
People from Oujda
National Liberation Front (Algeria) politicians
21st-century Algerian people